Fat Chance may refer to:
Fat Chance (album), a 2001 album by Paul Heaton
Fat Chance (Clark novel), a 1996 young adult novel by Margaret Clark
Fat Chance (film), a 1994 documentary film
Fat Chance (Newman novel), a 1994 young adult novel by Lesléa Newman
Fat Chance: Probability from 0 to 1, a 2019 book by  Benedict Gross, Joe Harris, and Emily Riehl